A list of the compositions by Marc Wilkinson, divided by genre:

Music for theatre productions and revue
 Richard III (Royal Shakespeare Company, 1961)
 Cymbeline (Royal Shakespeare Company, 1962)
 The Dutch Courtesan (1964)
 The Royal Hunt of the Sun (1964)
 Mother Courage and her Children (1964)
 Trelawny of the Wells (1965)
 Love For Love (1965)
 Armstrong’s Last Goodnight (1965)
 A Bond Honoured (1966)
 The Performing Giant (Royal Court Theatre, London, 1966)
 The Storm (1966)
 Macbeth (1966)
 Rosencrantz and Guildenstern Are Dead (1967)
 As You Like It (1967)
 Three Sisters (1967)
 Volpone (1968)
 Love’s Labour’s Lost (1968)
 Back to Methuselah (1968)
 The Covent Garden Tragedy (1968)
 The Way of the World (1969)
 The Travails of Sancho Panza (1969)
 The White Devil (1969)
 National Health (1969)
 Cyrano de Bergerac (1970)
 The Good Natured Man (1971)
 The Duchess of Malfi (1971)
 A Woman Killed With Kindness (1971)
 Byron, the Naked Peacock (1971)
 Jumpers (1972)
 Richard II (1972)
 The Misanthrope (1972)
 The Bacchae (1973)
 The Cherry Orchard (1973)
 Equus (1973)
 Romeo and Juliet (1974)
 Grand Manoeuvres (1974)
 Spring Awakening (1974)
 Too True to Be Good (1975)
 Carte Blanche (1976)
 Man and Superman (1977)
 Wild Oats (1977)
 The Beaux Stratagem (1988)

Film scores
 If.... (1968)
 The Royal Hunt of the Sun (1969)
 The Blood on Satan's Claw (1971)
 Family Life (film) (1971)
 The Darwin Adventure - documentary (1972)
 The Man and the Snake (short) (1972)
 The Triple Echo (1972)
 Eagle in a Cage (1972)
 I The Return (short) (1973)
 The Hireling (1973)
 Philadelphia, Here I Come (1975)
 The Morning Spider (short) (1976)
 The Mango Tree (1977)
 The Quatermass Conclusion (1979: edited down from TV series)
 Eagle's Wing (1979)
 The Fiendish Plot of Dr. Fu Manchu (1980)
 Looks and Smiles (1981)
 Enigma (1982)
 A Day on the Grand Canal with the Emperor of China or: Surface Is Illusion But So Is Depth (documentary) (1988)
 Rosencrantz & Guildenstern are Dead (1990)

Television scores
 Play for Today (TV series) (1970–79) 
 "The Lie" (1970)
 "Blue Remembered Hills" (1979)
 Days of Hope (TV drama mini-series) (1975) 
 "1916: Joining Up" (1975)
 "1921" (1975)
 "1924" (1975)
 "1926: General Strike" (1975)
 Quatermass (TV series) (1979) 
 "Ringstone Round" (1979)
 "Lovely Lightning" (1979)
 "What Lies Beneath" (1979)
 "An Endangered Species" (1979)
 Hammer House of Horror (TV series) (1980) 
 "Visitor from the Grave" (1980)
 Very Like a Whale (TV movie) (1981)
 Tales of the Unexpected (TV series) (1981–88) 
 "The Way to Do It" (1981)
 "The Skeleton Key" (1982)
 "The Absence of Emily" (1982)
 "A Harmless Vanity" (1982)
 "A Time to Die" (1988)
 The Bell (TV series: four episodes) (1982)
 All for Love (TV series) (1982-3) 
 "A Dedicated Man" (1982)
 "Mrs Silly" (1983)
 The Case of the Frightened Lady (TV movie) (1983)
 Kim (TV movie) (1984)
 A Voyage Round My Father (TV movie) (1984)
 Coming Through (TV movie) (1985)
 End of Empire (TV documentary series) (1985)
 Screen Two (TV series) (1987) 
 "Visitors" (1987)
 Ruth Rendell Mysteries (TV series) (1987) 
 "Wolf to the Slaughter: Part One" (1987)

References

Wilkinson, Marc
Film music